Carl-Oscar Andersson (born 2 April 1992), sometimes spelled Carl-Oskar Andersson, is a Swedish footballer who plays for Knattspyrnufélag Fjarðabyggðar as a midfielder. He is son of the comedian Annika Andersson and the GAIS chairman Tomas Andersson.

References

External links
  (archive)

1992 births
Living people
Association football midfielders
Falkenbergs FF players
New York Cosmos B players
National Premier Soccer League players
Swedish footballers
Allsvenskan players
People from Varberg
Sportspeople from Halland County